{{Infobox school
 | name                    = Oakwood School
 | type                    = [[Education in Australia#Government schools|] co-educational Secondary school
 | head_name               = Principal
 | colors                  = Green
 | status                  = Open''
 | closed                  = 
 | head                    = Paul Newson
 | city                    = , Melbourne, Victoria
 | country                 = Australia
 | coordinates             = 
 | homepage                = 
}}Oakwood School''' is a government school which was created to enrol students who have stopped attending school.  The school operates over a range of sites across the Southern, South-East and Mornington Peninsula areas. 

As a school our focus in on student learning and our students continually tell us how much they have learnt at Oakwood School.   Further to this, our students demonstrate to us that through their success with learning they feel empowered to pursue a future, that prior to Oakwood School, they were unable to even dream about.

The program at Oakwood School is carefully designed to meet the needs of each individual student.  Considerable time is devoted to student induction, which allows the student to attend school for short sessions to work individually with their class teacher.  The program focusses on developing the student’s literacy and numeracy skills, positive behaviours and where possible specialist subjects in Art and Physical Education.

References

Defunct public primary schools in Melbourne
Buildings and structures in the City of Greater Dandenong